This is a list of Spanish soups and stews. Spanish cuisine is a way of preparing varied dishes, which is enriched by the culinary contributions of the various regions that make up the country. It is a cuisine influenced by the people who, throughout history, have conquered the territory of that country. Soup is a primarily liquid food, generally served warm (but may be cool or cold), that is made by combining ingredients such as meat and vegetables with stock, juice, water, or another liquid. Stew is a combination of solid food ingredients that have been cooked in liquid and served in the resultant gravy. Stews are typically cooked at a relatively low temperature (simmered, not boiled), allowing flavors to mingle.

Spanish soups and stews

See also
 List of soups
 List of stews

References

External links
 

 
Spain
Soups and stews